Jude may refer to:

People

Biblical
 Jude, brother of Jesus, who is sometimes identified as being the same person as Jude the Apostle
 Jude the Apostle, an apostle also called Judas Thaddaeus or Lebbaeus, the patron saint of lost causes in the Catholic Church
 Epistle of Jude, a book of the New Testament of the Bible 
 Saint Jude (disambiguation)

Given name
 Jude (singer) (born 1969), American singer-songwriter
 Jude Abaga (born 1981), Nigerian hip hop artist
 Jude Abbott (born 1962), English musician
 Jude Acers (born 1944), American chess master
 Jude Adjei-Barimah (born 1992), Italian-American football cornerback 
 Jude Aneke (born 1990), Nigerian forward
 Jude Angelini (born 1977), American radio host and author known as Rude Jude
 Jude Anthany Joseph, Indian film director, screenwriter and actor
 Jude Bellingham (born 2003), English footballer
 Jude Bolton (born 1980), Australian rules footballer
 Jude Deveraux (born 1947), American novelist
 Jude Law (born 1972), English actor
 Jude Wijethunge (died 1996), Sri Lankan Sinhala naval officer

Surname
 Anton Jude (1960–2012), Sri Lankan actor
Brian Jude (born 1971), American screenwriter, film producer, director, actor, internet radio host and motivational speaker
 George W. Jude (1867–1958), American politician
James Jude (1928–2015), American thoracic surgeon
 Radu Jude (born 1977), Romanian film director
 Tad Jude (born 1951), American judge and politician
 Victor N. Jude (1923–1994), American businessman and politician

Fictional
 Jude Lizowski, a character on the Canadian animated series 6teen and Total DramaRama
 Jude, a character in the 2007 film Across the Universe
 Jude, a character in the Canadian teen drama series The Next Step
 Jude Duarte, a character in the novel series The Folk of the Air by Holly Black
 Jude St. Francis, a character in the book "A Little Life" by Hanya Yanagihara

Other uses
 Armand-Jude River, a river in Charlevoix Regional County Municipality, Capitale-Nationale, Quebec, Canada
 Jude the Obscure, a novel by Thomas Hardy
 Jude (film), a film based on the Hardy novel
 Jude (album), a 2022 album by Julian Lennon
 St. Jude storm, 2013 weather storm in Europe
 Jude, a medieval Romanian judge over an area called a Judeţ

See also 
 
 Judas (disambiguation)
 Judah (disambiguation)
 "Hey Jude", a song by the band the Beatles
 The Judes, a Canadian band
 astah*, a software modeling and diagraming tool, formerly known as JUDE
 Jute (disambiguation)
 Jutes, an Anglo-Saxon tribe

Unisex given names